WKTY (580 AM) is a radio station broadcasting a sports format. Licensed to La Crosse, Wisconsin, United States, the station serves the La Crosse area. The station is owned by Mid-West Family Broadcasting and features programming from Westwood One and CBS Sports Radio.

Play-by-Play Sports
The station serves as the La Crosse affiliate for the Green Bay Packers of the National Football League, Milwaukee Brewers of Major League Baseball, and Milwaukee Bucks of the National Basketball Association.  WKTY also carries local college and high school athletics.

Programming 
WKTY broadcast a mixture of local, regional, and national sports programming. Its national shows include The Dan Patrick Show, The Jim Rome Show, and select programming from CBS Sports Radio and Westwood One. The station also carries The Bill Michaels Show, a regional sports talk show; local programming with Dave Carney in the morning, The WiscoSports Show in the evenings with Grant Blise; and local play-by-play sports.

History
WKTY began broadcasting May 27, 1948, on 580 kHz with 1 KW power (full-time). It was owned by the La Crosse Broadcasting Company and was a Mutual affiliate.  During the 1980s, the station was full service, switching back and forth between playing country music and adult contemporary.

References

External links

KTY
Sports radio stations in the United States
Radio stations established in 1962
CBS Sports Radio stations